Grallaria is a large genus of Neotropical birds in the antpitta family Grallariidae.

The genus was introduced by the French ornithologist Louis Jean Pierre Vieillot in 1816 with the variegated antpitta (Grallaria varia) as the type species. The genus name is from New Latin grallarius meaning "stilt-walker".

Species 
The genus contains the following 45 species
 Undulated antpitta, Grallaria squamigera
 Giant antpitta, Grallaria gigantea
 Great antpitta, Grallaria excelsa
 Variegated antpitta, Grallaria varia
 Scaled antpitta, Grallaria guatimalensis
 Moustached antpitta, Grallaria alleni
 Táchira antpitta, Grallaria chthonia
 Plain-backed antpitta, Grallaria haplonota
 Ochre-striped antpitta, Grallaria dignissima
 Elusive antpitta, Grallaria eludens
 Santa Marta antpitta, Grallaria bangsi
 Chestnut-crowned antpitta, Grallaria ruficapilla
 Cundinamarca antpitta, Grallaria kaestneri
 Watkins's antpitta, Grallaria watkinsi
 Stripe-headed antpitta, Grallaria andicolus
 Chestnut-naped antpitta, Grallaria nuchalis
 Jocotoco antpitta, Grallaria ridgelyi
 Pale-billed antpitta, Grallaria carrikeri
 Yellow-breasted antpitta, Grallaria flavotincta
 White-bellied antpitta, Grallaria hypoleuca
 Rusty-tinged antpitta, Grallaria przewalskii
 Bay antpitta, Grallaria capitalis
 Red-and-white antpitta, Grallaria erythroleuca
 White-throated antpitta, Grallaria albigula
 Grey-naped antpitta, Grallaria griseonucha
 Grallaria rufula complex 
Perijá antpitta, Grallaria saltuensis
Sierra Nevada antpitta Grallaria spatiator
Muisca antpitta, Grallaria rufula
Bicolored antpitta, Grallaria rufocinerea
Chamí antpitta Grallaria alvarezi
Equatorial antpitta Grallaria saturata
Cajamarca antpitta Grallaria cajamarcae
 Chachapoyas antpitta Grallaria gravesi
Panao antpitta Grallaria oneilli
Junín antpitta Grallaria obscura
 Urubamba antpitta Grallaria occabambae
Puno antpitta Grallaria sinaensis
Bolivian antpitta Grallaria cochabambae
 Grallaria blakei complex
Chestnut antpitta, Grallaria blakei
Oxapampa antpitta Grallaria centralis
Ayacucho antpitta Grallaria ayacuchensis
 Rufous-faced antpitta, Grallaria erythrotis
 Tawny antpitta, Grallaria quitensis
 Brown-banded antpitta, Grallaria milleri
 Fenwick's or Urrao antpitta, Grallaria fenwickorum

References

 
Bird genera
Grallariidae
Taxa named by Louis Jean Pierre Vieillot
Taxonomy articles created by Polbot

pl:Kusaczki